Benghazi al-Jadida or New benghazi is a Basic People's Congress administrative division of Benghazi, Libya. It is part of the city of Benghazi located east of the port and west of Al-Hawari.

References

Basic People's Congress divisions of Benghazi